Lake Danao is the smaller of the two lakes located in the Balinsasayao Twin Lakes Natural Park in the southern part of Negros Oriental in the Philippines; the other being Lake Balinsasayao. The lake itself has about  surface area.

Flora and fauna
The lake supports a rich fish fauna, including a number of introduced species. The surrounding dipterocarp forest is rich in bird life.

References

External links
 Geographic data related to Lake Danao (Negros) at OpenStreetMap

Danao
Landforms of Negros Oriental